This is a list of band names, with their name origins explained and referenced with reliable sources.

#
 2Cellos — The band consists of two members, and each one plays a cello.
3 Doors Down — The band started out with drummer/vocalist Brad Arnold, bassist Todd Harrell and guitarist Matt Roberts. As they decided to tour outside of their hometown of Escatawpa, Mississippi and into Foley, Alabama, they came up with their official name as they saw a building with a sign with most of its letters fallen off, reading "Doors Down". Since at the time they started out with 3 band members the name stuck and called themselves 3 Doors Down.
311 — 311 is an Omaha, Nebraska, police code for indecent exposure. One rainy day, 311 bassist P-Nut and some friends went skinny dipping in a public pool. They were apprehended by police. One of P-Nut's friends, Jim Watson, was arrested, cuffed (naked), and taken home to his parents. He was issued a citation for a code 311. The band found the incident amusing, so they based their name on it.
10cc — By his own account, Jonathan King chose the name for the band after signing them to his record label UK Records, after having a dream in which he was standing in front of the Hammersmith Odeon in London where the boarding read "10cc The Best Band in the World". A widely repeated claim, disputed by King, but confirmed in a 1988 interview by Lol Creme and also on the webpage of Graham Gouldman's current line-up, is that the band name represented a volume of semen that was more than the average amount ejaculated by men ("cc" being an abbreviation of cubic centimetre), thus emphasising their potency or prowess.
50 Cent — The artist adopted the nickname "50 Cent" as a metaphor for change, after having served time at boot camp for selling drugs to an undercover police officer. The name was inspired by Kelvin Martin, a 1980s Brooklyn robber known as "50 Cent"; the artist chose it "because it says everything I want it to say. I'm the same kind of person 50 Cent was. I provide for myself by any means."
100 gecs — The name came from a spray-painted phrase seen by the duo in Chicago.
1349 — Named after the year the Bubonic plague reached Norway.
The 1975 — Lead singer Matthew Healy said in an interview that he came up with the name after discovering an old art journal from a beatnik, with one of the dates listed as "June 1st, the 1975". Healy said that he thought the placement of "the" in a recorded date was intriguing, and decided to use it as the name for the band.

A
 a-ha — A title that member Pål Waaktaar contemplated giving to a song. Morten Harket was looking through Waaktaar's notebook and came across the name "a-ha". He liked it and said, "That's a great name. That's what we should call ourselves." After checking dictionaries in several languages, they found out that a-ha was an international way of expressing recognition, with positive connotations. It was short, easy to say, and unusual.
 A-Teens — The 'A' stands for ABBA since they started as a cover band for the group; their name was originally ABBA-Teens but was changed upon the request from Björn Ulvaeus and Benny Andersson to avoid confusion. The group later did other songs, such as "Upside Down".
 ABBA — a palindromic acronym from the initials of the first names of the band members: Agnetha Fältskog, Björn Ulvaeus, Benny Andersson and Anni-Frid Lyngstad. A producer of canned fish was already using the name Abba so the band asked permission from them to use the name ABBA.
AC/DC — Malcolm and Angus Young developed the idea for the band's name after their sister seeing "AC/DC" on an electric sewing machine, "why not AC/DC".
 Ace of Base — The band's first studio was in the basement of a car repair shop, and they considered themselves to be the "masters" of the studio. "Ace of Base" was derived from "masters of the basement".
 A Day to Remember — A former member's ex-girlfriend used the term and the name stuck.
 Adiemus — Creator Karl Jenkins invented the word, unaware at the time that it means "We will draw near" in Latin.
 Aerosmith — Name invented by the band's drummer Joey Kramer
 Aiden — After a character from the 2002 film The Ring.
 Air Supply — Five years before the band's signing, Graham Russell saw the name in a dream.
The Airborne Toxic Event — Named by leader Mikel Jollett after a section in Don DeLillo's novel White Noise in which a poisonous gas cloud results from a chemical spill from a train car. Jollett saw a similarity between the life-altering perspective shift in the novel's protagonist and the life-altering series of events that gave rise to the band, and the themes of mortality and media consumption resulting from the gas cloud in the novel are a source of inspiration for the band.
 AKB48 — After Tokyo's area Akihabara (colloquially shortened to Akiba), a mecca for electronics shopping and geeks. The group was formed as theater-based, to perform at its own theater at Akihabara on a daily basis, so that fans could always go and see them live. It still performs there every day, although, after the group's popularity went up, tickets started being distributed only via an online lottery.
 Alexisonfire — from contortionist stripper Alexis Fire, which nearly resulted in a lawsuit from the stripper's representatives.
 Alice Cooper — Alice Cooper was a band before frontman Vincent Furnier started a solo career under the same name. Allegedly, Alice Cooper was the name of a spirit members of the band came in contact with through a ouija, though Furnier has also claimed that he wanted their name to contrast with their sound, and Alice Cooper sounds like somebody's grandmother.
 Alice in Chains — The name was taken from lead singer Layne Staley's previous group, the glam metal band Alice N' Chains. Staley shed some light on the subject in a Rolling Stone article in 1992: "The name came from a side project of my old group [Alice N' Chains]. We were going to have this band that dressed up in drag and played heavy metal as a joke." Alice N' Chains' bassist Johnny Bacolas explained the name in the 2011 book Everybody Loves Our Town: A History of Grunge. Bacolas and Russ Klatt (the lead singer of Slaughter Haus 5), were at a party in North Seattle talking about backstage passes. One of the passes said "Welcome to Wonderland", and they started talking about that being an Alice in Wonderland-type thing, until Klatt started saying, "What about Alice in Chains? Put her in bondage and stuff like that." Bacolas thought the name "Alice in Chains" was cool and brought it up to his Sleze bandmates and everyone liked it, so they changed the name of the band. Since three of the members had very Christian mothers, they thought spelling it "Alice N' Chains" made it not sound a bondage name. After Staley left Alice N' Chains, he contacted his former bandmates and asked for permission to use the name with his new band with guitarist Jerry Cantrell.
 Alien Ant Farm — Bassist Terry Corso said the name was a day dream he had about how Earth is just an experiment for aliens from other planets.
 The All-American Rejects — The "All-Americans" and "the Rejects", both suggested to the band as names, were merged.
 All Time Low — When in high school, members Alex Gaskarth, Jack Barakat, Rian Dawson, and Zack Merrick made a list of possible band names, one of which being "All Time Low". The name came from New Found Glory's song "Head On Collision".
 Alt-J—The spoken form of the band ∆, alt + j is the keyboard shortcut used to type ∆ on a Mac computer. ∆ is a symbol used to show change in mathematical equations.
Amber Run — Originally known as Amber, the band changed their name to avoid confusion with a German musician of the same name.
AlunaGeorge — From the first names of the members, Aluna Francis and George Reid.
Amon Amarth — Named after "Mount Doom", in Tolkien's Elvish speech.
 Anamanaguchi — The name came about from a member in one of Peter Berkman's former bands pronouncing gibberish in the style of Jabba the Hutt; The band has also explained it as coming from the members' internships at Armani (Berkman and James DeVito), Prada (Ary Warnaar), and Gucci (Luke Silas) while studying fashion at Parsons School of Design.
 Anberlin — Band member Stephen Christian has offered the explanations that he planned naming his first daughter Anberlin and that the name was a modification of the phrase "and Berlin" from a list of cities Christian wanted to visit. The one story that Christian asserts is true, however, is that he heard the word in the background noise of the Radiohead song "Everything in Its Right Place".
 ...And You Will Know Us by the Trail of Dead — Initially claimed to be a line in a Mayan ritual chant, though lead singer Conrad Keely has since admitted the story was a joke.
 Animals as Leaders — Inspired by the 1992 novel Ishmael by Daniel Quinn, guitarist Tosin Abasi coined the name as a reminder that "we're all essentially animals". Abasi went into further depth by saying, "The name is kind of like, a lot of what we do is completely removed from the fact that we're all essentially animals. We have a niche on the planet and we have a role in sustainable sort of ecology. But we've gone against our natural calling. The name is acknowledging that we do have more of a natural role on the planet. It's also like, who would follow an animal to do anything? I think of the name as being both nonsensical and really literal."
 Apollo 440 — From the Greek god Apollo and the frequency of concert pitch—the A note at 440 Hz, often denoted as "A440", and the Sequential Circuits sampler/sequencer, the Studio 440.
 Apulanta — Means "fertiliser" in Finnish. Invented as a joke when the band had to come up with a "punk" sounding name.
 Arcade Fire — Based on a story that singer Win Butler heard as a kid. He was told that an arcade in Exeter had burnt down, killing many youths.
 Arctic Monkeys — The name was made up by the guitarist, Jamie Cook, while at school.
 Art of Noise — After the 1913 manifesto called The Art of Noises by Italian Futurist Luigi Russolo.
 Die Ärzte — Decided when the band noticed that the folder with the umlaut "Ä" was empty in most record stores. The band often stylises their name, which is grammatically correct German, with three dots in the umlaut in the letter "Ä", as a parody of the heavy metal umlaut. There is no real diacritic with three dots in any language.
 As I Lay Dying — After the 1930 novel As I Lay Dying by William Faulkner.
 Ash — The band chose the first short word they liked in the dictionary, as stated in the CD booklet of Intergalactic Sonic 7"s.
 Asking Alexandria — According to band member Danny Worsnop, the name was taken from Alexander the Great.
 Atreyu — After a character in 1979 novel The NeverEnding Story and the 1984 movie of the same name.
 Audioslave — According to lead guitarist Tom Morello, the name supposedly came to singer Chris Cornell in a vision.
 Auto-Icon — Derived from the term Auto-Iconization first attributed to Jeremy Bentham, Utility and Democracy: The Political Thought of Jeremy Bentham. Auto-Icon Started as a one-man project in Los Angeles in 1999 with the end of the century and Y2K looming, it seemed to founding member J. Hébert any one could call themselves an "Icon".
 Automatic Pilot — From psychiatric testimony characterizing Dan White's state of mind while killing George Moscone and Harvey Milk.
 The Avalanches — Taken from the 1960s surf rock band of the same name.
 Avenged Sevenfold — Taken from the Book of Genesis, from the passage "If Cain shall be avenged sevenfold, Truly Lamech seventy and sevenfold."
 Avicii — Stage name of Tim Bergling; he explained that the name Avicii means "the lowest level of Buddhist hell" (Avīci) and he chose the moniker because his real name was already used upon creating his Myspace page.
 A Wilhelm Scream — The Wilhelm scream is a frequently-used film and television stock sound effect first used in 1951 for the film Distant Drums. The band were previously named 'Koen' and then 'Smackin Isaiah' before finally settling on the current appellation.
 Awolnation — The name is derived from leader Aaron Bruno's high school nickname. In an interview with Kristin Houser of the LA Music Blog, he stated that he "would leave without saying goodbye" because it was just easier, so that's where the name AWOL (slang from the military acronym for Absent Without Leave) came from."

B
 The B-52's — From the name of a beehive hairstyle, itself named for the Boeing B-52 Stratofortress.
 Babymetal — According to Kobametal (the band's producer), the name came to him by revelation (as a "divine message"). It is a play on the words "heavy metal".
 Bachman–Turner Overdrive — A combination of band members' last names and the magazine Overdrive. The band's name had previously been "Bachman-Turner". All band members agreed that Bachman-Turner Overdrive sounded cooler.
 Backstreet Boys — After a flea market in Orlando, Florida.
 Bad Religion — Bad Religion's Greg Graffin on their name:
You have to remember that we were fifteen-year-old punks—we wanted to piss people off. Anything that might make parents, teachers, and people with authority bristle was up for discussion. We also wanted a name that would suggest a great logo for stickers and T-shirts. Many of the names were compelling but too repulsive. Smegma, Vaginal Discharge, and Head Cheese might make for great logos but were quickly rejected as not representative of our songs. We played around with a lot of names involving the word "bad"—Bad Family Planning, Bad Politics. When we hot [sic] on Bad Religion, it seemed perfect. That year, 1980, was a time of rising prominence for televangelists like Jimmy Swaggart, Pat Robertson, and Jim Bakker. The year before, Jerry Falwell had founded the Moral Majority, which was having a powerful influence on the presidential election between Jimmy Carter and Ronald Reagan. Religion was a hot topic, and those TV preachers seemed like a good target to us, though we didn't think they could possibly last for more than a few years. We knew that most people were so defensive about their religious ideas that they would be highly offended by our name—a major plus! And then Brett came up with a logo that represented our philosophical stance. We felt complete.
 Badding — After the children's literary character Paddington Bear.
 Badfinger — Originally called "The Iveys" after a street in Swansea, Wales. Once the band was signed to Apple Records by The Beatles the band took the opportunity to change their name. The name "Badfinger" was derived from "Bad Finger Boogie", the working title of The Beatles' "With a Little Help from My Friends".
 The Band — They were originally known as The Hawks, after their original lead singer Ronnie Hawkins. While working with Bob Dylan in the 1960s, they decided to change their name, but were unable to agree on a new name. They finally decided to simply call themselves "The Band" after being derisively referred to as "the band" by critics of Dylan's new electric direction on the 1966 tour.
 Bananarama  — Partially named after the Roxy Music song Pyjamarama. 
 Barenaked Ladies — Two members—Steven Page and Ed Robertson—were bored at a Bob Dylan concert and turned to amusing each other, pretending they were rock critics, inventing histories and comments about the Dylan band. They also made up various fictional band names, one of which was "Barenaked Ladies". On another front, Robertson had agreed to perform with his cover band in a battle of the bands at Nathan Phillips Square for the Second Harvest food bank. The band broke up and he forgot about the gig. When he received a phone call a week before the show, asking him to confirm the gig, he improvised that the name of the band had changed to "Barenaked Ladies", recalling the name from the Dylan concert. He then called Page and asked if he wanted to do the gig; Page reportedly could not believe Robertson had given that name. The two played the show on October 1, 1988, They arranged three rehearsals and missed them all. The two played the show on October 1, 1988, but instead of competing, they played while the other bands set up, playing every song they could think of that they both knew. The show went well and the pair continued performing and started writing songs together.
 Bastille — Lead singer Dan Smith was born on July 14, Bastille Day.
 Bat & Ryyd — Originally named Batman & Ryydman, but shortened to "Bat & Ryyd" after a complaint from composer Kari Rydman.
 Bauhaus — Originally named "Bauhaus 1919" after the German Bauhaus art movement, and shortened to "Bauhaus" in 1979.
 Beastie Boys — Has the backronym "Boys Entering Anarchistic States Towards Inner Excellence"
 The Beatles — The Crickets were cited as an inspiration for the name. Additionally, the misspelling of "beetles" was a play on words, describing the "beat" of the band.
 The Beautiful South — The Beautiful South were an English alternative rock group formed at the end of the 1980s by two former members of Hull group The Housemartins, Paul Heaton and Dave Hemingway. Heaton explained at the time that the name was partly a sarcastic reflection of his own dislike of southern England, and partly an attempt to force macho men to utter the word 'beautiful'.
 Bee Gees — From "B.G.", the initials of all three of band member Barry Gibb, radio DJ Bill Gates and speedway promoter and driver Bill Goode. The similarity to "Brothers Gibb" is just a coincidence.
 Belle & Sebastian — From Belle et Sébastien, a children's book by French writer Cécile Aubry.
 Between the Buried and Me — The band name was derived from a phrase in Counting Crows' song "Ghost Train"
 Biffy Clyro — There are many rumours of the origin of Biffy Clyro's name. These are that, one time, lead singer Simon Neil bought a Cliff Richard pen, which was therefore a "Cliffy biro". They then changed this to Biffy Clyro. Another theory is that 'Biffy Clyro' were a Welsh tribe. The third rumour is that Biffy Clyro was a former player of the band's football team, Ayr United. They have never confirmed any of these.
 Big Drill Car — The band members have claimed in interviews that their name was inspired by the movie Journey to the Center of the Earth.
 Billy Talent — After a character in the film Hard Core Logo (although the name in the film and the book by Michael Turner it was adapted from is spelled "Billy Tallent").
 The Birthday Massacre — The name of the band's early song. According to their vocalist Chibi: "It kind of works well for the music that we're making. Sort of contrasty, you know? Birthday, and massacre. Light, and dark. Cute, and evil." The band was originally known as Imagica, but adopted the current name to avoid confusion with another group. The song "The Birthday Massacre" was then renamed to "Happy Birthday".
The Black Crowes — The group originally called themselves Mr. Crowe's Garden, after a favorite children's book. They performed under that name until they signed with Def American Records in 1989. They renamed themselves in response to the suggestion of a producer.
Black Flag — Suggested by guitarist Greg Ginn's brother, Raymond Pettibone, because "if a white flag means surrender, a black flag means anarchy."
The Black Keys — When the duo grew up in Akron, Ohio, a schizophrenic man residing in a halfway house used to call their homes to ask for crayons, Diet Coke and cigarettes. His messages would always end with him saying "...don't be a black key. Don't be a b-flat."
Black Rebel Motorcycle Club — The film The Wild One featured two motorcycle gangs, the Beetles and Black Rebels Motorcycle Club. In a reference to the story that The Beatles took their name from one motorcycle gang, Peter Hayes (guitarist) and Robert Levon Been (bassist) originally named their band "The Other Gang", but switched to Black Rebel Motorcycle Club when The Other Gang did not catch on.
Black Sabbath — Originally known as Earth, the group wanted to change their name as another group had the same name. The group saw a local cinema playing a film titled Black Sabbath and marvelled that people paid money to be frightened. 
Blind Melon — Bass player Brad Smith's father used this term to refer to some hippies who lived in a commune near his house.
Blink-182 — The "Blink" was thought up by Tom DeLonge when the band consisted of DeLonge, Mark Hoppus, and their friend Scott Raynor. (They previously called themselves Duck Tape.) An Irish electronica artist was already using the name Blink, so they added "182" to the end.
Blondie — A nickname given to frontwoman Debbie Harry by truck drivers who catcalled "Hey, Blondie" to Harry as they drove by.
Blue October — The front man of Blue October, Justin Furstenfeld, spent a brief stint in a mental hospital in October 1997. Furstenfeld stated that afterwards he wrote songs to keep depression away which led to the forming of the band.
Blur — The band had been known as "Seymour" until they were signed to Food Records in 1990. The label disliked the band name and suggested the group pick a new one from a provided list, from which "Blur" was eventually chosen.
 Boards of Canada — Named in tribute to the National Film Board of Canada. The brothers spent part of their youth growing up in Canada, and credit the Film Board's documentaries as a source of inspiration for their sound.
 bob hund — From a cartoon dog named Bob that the band once saw on TV.
The Boomtown Rats — As revealed in his autobiography, Bound for Glory, this was the name of Woody Guthrie's boyhood gang, named after his hometown, Oklahoma City, known as 'Boomtown' during the oil boom.
Bon Iver — Suggested by an episode of Northern Exposure in which, after the first snow of winter, people greet each other with bon hiver (French for "good winter"). This was initially transcribed by Vernon as "boniverre". When he learned of its proper French spelling, he elected not to use it, deciding "hiver" reminded him too much of liver; he had been bedridden with a liver ailment when he watched the show.
Bon Jovi — An alternative spelling of Jon Bon Jovi's last name Bongiovi, following the example of the other famous two-word bands such as Van Halen, as suggested by Pamela Maher.
Bonzo Dog Doo-Dah Band — A combination of Bonzo the dog and the Dada art movement.
Boyz II Men — Originally known as Unique Attraction, they were renamed after a song by New Edition. 
Brainerd — Original guitarist Knife named the band after his hometown, Brainerd, Minnesota.
Breaking Benjamin — During a live performance, frontman Benjamin Burnley accidentally knocked a microphone over, causing it to crack once it hit the ground. The microphone's owner appeared on stage to say "I'd like to thank Benjamin for breaking my f*cking microphone."
Bring Me the Horizon — From a line said by Captain Jack Sparrow in Pirates of the Caribbean: The Curse of the Black Pearl, "Now ... bring me that horizon".
Burzum — Means "darkness" in Tolkien's Black Speech.
Butthole Surfers — The band, who previously changed their name at every gig, was performing an earlier version of 1984's "Butthole Surfer" when the announcer forgot the band's name and used the title of the song instead. They were forced to keep this name after the performance hit fame.
Buzzcocks — The band took their name from a Time Out review of the 1976 T.V. show Rock Follies with the headline "It's the Buzz, Cock!" (Cock was slang for "mate".) The band members liked the subversiveness of it.

C
 Cage The Elephant — After one of their shows, a mentally ill man approached frontman Matt Shultz, hugged him and said "you have to cage the elephant".
 Cake — Rather than referring to the foodstuff, the name is meant to be "like when something insidiously becomes a part of your life...[we] mean it more as something that cakes onto your shoe and is just sort of there until you get rid of it".
 Cansei de Ser Sexy — Portuguese for "tired of being sexy", an alleged quote of Beyoncé Knowles, one of the largest musical influences upon this Brazilian band.
 Carach Angren — From Tolkien's The Lord of the Rings, named after a pass in Mordor. (Carach Angren means "Iron Jaws" in Elvish.)
 Car Seat Headrest — Founder Will Toledo chose the name "Car Seat Headrest" as he would often record the vocals to his early albums in the back seat of his car for privacy.
 C.C.C.P. — After SSSR, the Russian language abbreviation for the Soviet Union, which when written in the Cyrillic alphabet looks like it spells "CCCP".
 The Chainsmokers — Founding member Alex Pall explained it as follows: "At the time of conception it was, it was totally just like I was in college. You know I enjoyed smoking weed and you know it was just like such a 'yeah the domain's open'. I don't have to have any like underscores."
 Charli XCX — When playing at illegal warehouse parties, she needed a stage name and chose Charli XCX, which was her MSN Messenger screen name. The "XCX" stands for "kiss Charli kiss".
 Cheap Trick — Inspired by the band's attendance of a Slade concert, where bassist Tom Petersson commented that the band used "every cheap trick in the book" as part of their act.
 Childish Gambino — Donald Glover used a Wu-Tang Clan name generator in his sophomore year of college at NYU, inputting his real name and coming up with Childish Gambino.
 Children of Bodom — After being told by Spinefarm Records that the band's name had to change (the group having previously been signed to another label under the name Inearthed), the group looked through a local phone book to search for inspiration, coming across Lake Bodom. The band, like most of Finland, was already aware of the unsolved murder of three teenagers camping at the lake. The band believed they had found an impacting name with an interesting story behind it, and so chose the name Children of Bodom. Many of their songs have also been named after the murders, such as "Lake Bodom", "Silent Night, Bodom Night", "Children of Bodom" and "Bodom After Midnight".
 Chevelle — Named after the car.
 Chvrches — Pronounced "churches", the band decided on the spelling to distinguish themselves in internet searches.
 Cirith Ungol — Named after the "Pass of the Spider" in Tolkien's The Lord of the Rings.
 Clean Bandit — Members Grace Chatto and Jack Patterson lived in Moscow for a while; their landlady referred to a friend of theirs using a Russian affectionate phrase meaning something like "utter rascal". "Clean bandit" is a more literal translation.
 Coldplay — The band were called "Starfish" originally and a friend's group was called "Coldplay". When they did not want the name anymore, "Starfish" asked if they could use it instead. The original Coldplay took the name from a book of collected poems called Child's Reflections: Cold Play.
 Conchita Wurst — From the German expression "das ist mir doch alles Wurst", meaning "it's all the same to me" and a Cuban friend of the artist's named Conchita. The artist has also explained that conchita is Spanish slang for vagina and Wurst is German slang for penis.
 Crass — A reference to the line "The kids was just crass" in David Bowie's song "Ziggy Stardust". 
 Creed — Originally known as Naked Toddler, the band changed its name to Creed at bassist Brian Marshall's suggestion, after a band he had previously played for called Mattox Creed.
 Creedence Clearwater Revival — The band took the three elements from, firstly, Tom Fogerty's friend Credence Newball (to whose first name Credence they added an extra 'e', making it resemble a faith or creed); secondly, "clear water" from a TV commercial for Olympia beer; and finally "revival", which spoke to the four members' renewed commitment to their band.
Crime — The band was originally The Space Invaders who looked glam, but played primitive original material in the garage. They turned to a JV look and shortened the name to The Invaders. Tony Greene, who published a short lived SF punk zine No Exit convinced them to change their name to Crime.
 Crush 40 — Lead singer Johnny Gioeli explained to Gareth Spriggs (aka Fastest Thing Alive) at Summer of Sonic '10 that he never wanted to turn 40 years old, hence the name Crush 40, because he wanted to "Crush 40". The name is also a reference to Crush soda, guitarist Jun Senoue's favorite brand of soft drink.
 The Cure — The band's original name was Easy Cure, which was taken from the name of one of the group's early songs. The name was later shortened to The Cure because frontman Robert Smith felt the name was too American and "too hippyish".
 °C-ute (Cute) — The Japanese girl group was named by its producer Tsunku. According to him and the band's official website, the English word cute means "(little and) lovely, pretty". Wanting to somehow express the girls' overflowing fervor (enthusiasm), he substituted "°C" for "C".

D
 Daft Punk — In 1992, being heavily influenced by The Beach Boys, they recorded songs under the name Darlin', which was a Beach Boys single from their 1967 album Wild Honey. A negative review in the UK's Melody Maker described their effort as "a daft punky thrash", which depressed the pair but unwittingly gave them a name for their next project.
 Danny — Chosen intentionally at the start of the artist's career. The name "Danny" is an acronym of a certain phrase, but according to an interview with Tuulia magazine, Danny will only reveal this phrase after retiring.
 Danny Wilson — Chosen at the last minute after problems with their initial band name Spencer Tracy due to issues with the dead actor's estate, who threatened to sue their record label Virgin Records if they went ahead and released their debut album in the states under that name. Instead the brothers in the band Gary Clark and Kit Clark chose the titular character from the film Meet Danny Wilson as that was played by Frank Sinatra who was a favourite artist of their father.
 Darude — After the song "Rude Boy" by Swedish artist Leila K which he played a lot at a classmate's party, gradually morphed first into "Da Rude" and then "Darude".
 Dashboard Confessional — Derived from the line in the band's song "The Sharp Hint of New Tears" which is "on the way home, this car hears my confessions/I think tonight I'll take the long way home...".
 David Bowie — From the artist's real first name David and the surname of the 19th-century American pioneer James Bowie and the knife he had popularised.
 DAY6 — The name was given to the band with an original 6 members representing monday through saturday, and the fans representing sunday. 6+1=7 for 7 days of the week.
 Deacon Blue — Named after the Steely Dan song Deacon Blues. 
 Dead Kennedys — The name was not meant to insult the assassinated Kennedy brothers, but to quote vocalist Jello Biafra, "to bring attention to the end of the American Dream".
 The Dead Milkmen — According to the band's official website, band member Joe Genaro said that the name "actually existed before the band was a reality". He created the name in high school for a creative writing project, based on the main character of the Toni Morrison novel Song of Solomon.  The character, Macon Dead III, was nicknamed "Milkman" Dead.
 Deadmau5 — When his computer crashed and emitted a strange odor, Joel Thomas Zimmerman dismantled it and found a dead mouse inside. He later used the name as a username for various chatrooms.
 The Decemberists — The name refers to the Decembrist revolt, an 1825 revolt in Imperial Russia that Colin Meloy views as an attempted communist revolution.
 Death Cab for Cutie — named for the song Death Cab for Cutie composed by Vivian Stanshall and Neil Innes and performed by the Bonzo Dog Doo-Dah Band on their 1967 album Gorilla. The song was named for a headline in a tabloid about a woman killed in a taxi accident.
 Deep Purple — It was inspired by the song Deep Purple from Mitchell Parish. According to the band, it was one of guitarist Ritchie Blackmore's grandmother's favourite songs.
 Deftones — Created by lead guitarist Stephen Carpenter, who wanted to pick "something that would just stand out but you know, not be all cheese-ball at the same time". Carpenter combined the hip hop slang term "def", which was used by artists such as LL Cool J and Public Enemy, with the suffix "-tones", which was a popular suffix among 1950s bands (e.g., Dick Dale and the Del-Tones, The Quin-Tones, The Monotones, The Cleftones, and The Harptones). Carpenter said the name is intentionally vague to reflect the band's tendency to not focus on just one style of music.
 Depeche Mode — After a French fashion magazine, Dépêche Mode (literally "Fashion Dispatch").
 Der Plan — Inspired by a quote from a book by British author Gordon Rattray Taylor called "The Biological Timebomb", in which he describes the ability to make a plan as what distinguishes human beings from animals.
 The Devil Wears Prada — After the novel and comedy/drama movie of the same name.
 Devo — Inspired "from [the band's] concept of 'de-evolution'—the idea that instead of continuing to evolve, mankind has actually begun to regress, as evidenced by the dysfunction and herd mentality of American society."
 Dexys Midnight Runners — From the stimulant Dexedrine.
 Dingo — Originally named Sous-Pierre, which was shortened to Soho. However, a band in London was already using the name Soho, so founding member Pertti "Neumann" Nieminen came up with the name Dingo instead.
 Dio — Named for vocalist Ronnie James Dio, because his name was already well known at that time.
 Dire Straits — Comes from the band's financial situation at the time of forming.
 The Dirty Heads — The band's name comes from an occasion where Jared "Dirty J" Watson and vocalist/guitarist Dustin "Duddy B" Bushnell were stealing a 12-pack of beer, and someone shouted at them "Come here you little dirty heads!"
 The Dismemberment Plan — According to lead singer Travis Morrison, this Washington, DC band's name was inspired by part of a line in the movie Groundhog Day, in which "[t]here's a guy who chases after Bill Murray and tries to keep selling him different types of insurance and 'the dismemberment plan' was one of them. It just stuck."
 DNCE — Pronounced "dance", which member JinJoo Lee said "is not a perfect word, but you don't have to be a perfect dancer to dance in life."
 Don Johnson Big Band — Named after the actor Don Johnson in the series Miami Vice. The band had to come up with a name to reserve a place for training, so the name "Don Johnson Big Band" was invented spontaneously on the spot. The band is not a big band and bears little relation to Don Johnson.
 The Doors — Allusion to Aldous Huxley's book The Doors of Perception, whose title is taken from William Blake: "When the doors of perception are cleansed, things will appear to man as they truly are... infinite."
 Double Dagger — The band, founded by two graphic designers, took their name from the typographic symbol ‡, commonly used for footnotes and citations.
 Dream Theater — After a movie house in Monterey, California. The name was suggested by drummer Mike Portnoy's father, who lived in Monterey.
 Dropkick Murphys — After wrestler and alcoholic rehabilitation facility operator John "Dropkick" Murphy.
 Drummer — All of the band members were drummers for other bands.
 Duran Duran — Dr. Durand-Durand is the name of a character in the cult science fiction film Barbarella. The band played at Birmingham's Barberella's nightclub.

E
Earth, Wind & Fire — Frontman Maurice White's astrological sign is Sagittarius, which has a primary elemental quality of fire and seasonal qualities of earth and air.
The Eastern Dark — The 1980s Australian rock band took their name from a locale in the Phantom comics (referred to as Darcan or Darca in later strips) which was home to a multitude of evil and criminal enterprises. The Phantom is known, among his many names, as Guardian of the Eastern Dark.
 E Street Band — Bruce Springsteen's band was named after E Street (E, not East) in Belmar, New Jersey, because the band used to practice at the E Street home of pianist David Sancious's mother.
 Eiffel 65 — A computer chose the name Eiffel randomly from a group of words the three liked. The number 65 was added mistakenly to an early pressing of their first single, Blue (Da Ba Dee).
 ELO — Electric Light Orchestra is an intended pun based not only on electric light (as in a light bulb as seen on early album covers) but also using "electric" rock instruments combined with a "light orchestra" (orchestras with only a few cellos and violins that were popular in Britain during the 1960s).
 Elvis Hitler — A combination of American rockabilly singer Elvis Presley and Austrian-German politician Adolf Hitler.
 Emarosa — Previously known as Corsets are Cages, the band made up the current name.
 Eppu Normaali — After the character Abby Normal in the Mel Brooks movie Young Frankenstein, but renamed as a Finnish name, keeping the original pun ("Eppu Normaali" sounds like "epänormaali", Finnish for "abnormal").
 Eurythmics — After Dalcroze eurhythmics, a pedagogical exercise system that founding member Annie Lennox had encountered as a child.
 Evanescence — When asked where they got their name, they responded, "The dictionary." The word "evanescence" means "a disappearance or dissipation, like vapor". They apparently disliked their previous name and wanted something better. They also wanted to do some artwork (with whatever name they chose) and decided to look under E. They liked the word and definition, likening it to the temporal nature of life.
 Evergreen Terrace — Named after 742 Evergreen Terrace, the address of the Simpsons.
 Everything but the Girl — From the slogan used by the Hull shop Turner's Furniture on Beverley Road, which claimed "for your bedroom needs, we sell everything but the girl."
 Everything Everything — Derived either from the first two lines of the Radiohead song "Everything In Its Right Place", or from Karl Hyde's "everything, everything" vocal loop in the Underworld song Cowgirl.
 Exit Ten — After the motorway junction of the M4 to Reading, which constitutes the band's "home".
 Explosions in the Sky — After leaving a performance on KVRX on July 4, 1999, when the band was still operating under the name Breaker Morant, drummer Chris Hravsky compared the fireworks outside to explosions in the sky.

F
 The Fall — The band took their name from the 1956 Albert Camus novel of the same name.
 The Fall of Troy — The band reportedly picked their name by "opening a history textbook and pointing at a random location until [they] found a selection they liked".
 Fall Out Boy — Nameless for their first two shows as a band, at the end of their second show they asked the audience to yell out their ideas for a name. One audience member suggested "Fallout Boy", a reference to the sidekick of comic book superhero Radioactive Man from The Simpsons.
 The Farm — Originally thought to be named in tribute to Cantril Farm, a former council estate in Liverpool now known as Stockbridge Village, until frontman Peter Hooton confirmed that it was actually named after a farm outside Maghull where the band used to rehearse.
Fastball — Originally called "Magneto" until learning of a Mexican boy band of the same name, they first attempted to use the name "Magneto USA", but were ultimately advised against it.  The band eventually settled on "Fastball" in reference to a "baseball-themed porn movie".
 Felt — Bandleader Lawrence is a fan of the group Television, and chose the name in homage to how Tom Verlaine emphasises the word in the song "Venus".
 FIDLAR — While helping two of his friends from Hawaii find a home in Los Angeles, frontman Zac Carper overheard the pair repeating the skater mantra "FIDLAR". When Carper asked what FIDLAR meant, he was told that it was an acronym for "Fuck It Dog, Life's A Risk". The name stuck when every member of the band, with the exception of guitarist Elvis Keuhn, had the word tattooed on their bodies after a night of heavy drinking.
 First Aid Kit — Member Klara Söderberg explains: "I was 13, young and naïve and looking through a dictionary, looking for a name. Like I wanted something, if I would ever make music, I wanted to have a name for it, and I found First Aid Kit and just liked the meaning of it. I think music should be like a consolation to help you get through everyday life, and it does for me. I thought, if I ever make music, that's what I want my music to do. And when we started making music, it kinda stuck around."
Five Iron Frenzy — According to former bassist Keith Hoerig, a roommate of the band members would defend himself with a golf club, out of fear that he'd get attacked, and called it "putter mayhem". Guitarist Scott Kerr noticed that the roommate's club was a five iron and said, "No, more like a Five Iron Frenzy."
Five Finger Death Punch — Named after the fictional martial arts move called the "five point palm exploding heart technique" from the movies Kill Bill, which kills its victim by causing their heart to explode once they take five steps after being struck.
Fleetwood Mac — Named after members, Mick Fleetwood and John McVie.
Florence + The Machine — The name of Florence and the Machine is attributed to front-woman Florence Welch's teenage collaboration with keyboardist and co-writer Isabella "Machine" Summers. Welch and Summers performed together for a time under the names of "Florence Robot" and "Isa Machine", respectively. Later, this was shortened to Florence and the Machine as it was felt to be too cumbersome.
Flying Lotus — The name comes from his ideal superpower. "When I was a kid I would always bother people about super heroes and I was like, 'Ok if you could have any superpower in the creation of comic books what would you have, x-ray vision, you could be like invisible, what would you do?' I wanted to fly. That's it. That's all."
Foo Fighters — Adopted from a term used by Allied aircraft pilots in World War II to describe various UFOs or mysterious aerial phenomena.
Foster the People — Originally called "Foster & the People" by frontman Mark Foster, but changed when many of his friends misunderstood the name as "Foster the People". In a 2011 interview, Foster also recalled, Foster the People'—that's like 'Take Care of the People', 'Do Something for the People'... The first few shows that we played were for charities. It kind of clicked: Foster the People, that's us."
Fountains of Wayne — Member Adam Schlesinger got his driver's license at the DMV office next to a lawn ornament store (no longer in business) in Wayne, NJ called "Fountains of Wayne". "We just thought it was funny", Schlesinger said.
The Four Seasons — Taken from the bowling alley in Union Township, Union County, New Jersey, where the band used to audition.
Framing Hanley — Originally known as "Embers Fade", they changed their name to Framing Hanley in 2007, shortly after Ashley Hanley, fiancée of a member of the band (and a photographer, whence "Framing"), died.
Frankie Goes to Hollywood — The name Frankie Goes to Hollywood taken from a poster on the wall of an old prison cell where the band used to rehearse. The poster has the headline "Frankie Goes to Hollywood", which referred to Frank Sinatra's move from Las Vegas to Los Angeles. It was chosen by a friend and local artist, named Ambrose, from strange Liverpool cult group Pink Military.
Frente! — The Australian band took its name from a Spanish word meaning "forehead" or "front". The name originated without the exclamation point at the end; it was added for their 1991 debut EP release, Whirled. The rationale, as stated by lead vocalist Angie Hart, was while " don't write our name like that, but we thought we would on the CD covers because it looks good."
Fröbelin Palikat — The name (Finnish for "Fröbel's blocks") derives from the educational toy blocks designed by German pedagogue Friedrich Fröbel.
The Fugs — "Fugs" is a euphemism for the F-word in Norman Mailer's novel, The Naked and the Dead. Band member Tuli Kupferberg is credited with choosing the name.

G
 Galaxie 500 — After the Ford Galaxie car owned by a friend of the band's.
 Gang of Four — Named after the Gang of Four, a political faction in 1960s-1970s -era China.
 Garbage — Either lead singer Shirley Manson's father yelled down to the band at one of their basement practice sessions, "Play more quietly—you sound like garbage", or from a friend of drummer Butch Vig, who said "This stuff sounds like garbage!".
 The Gathering — Taken from the film Highlander, where it is mentioned that there will be a gathering once with all the immortals of the story.
 Genesis — Charterhouse School alumnus Jonathan King attended a concert at Charterhouse in 1968 while the band were still in school. King was a songwriter and record producer who had a hit single at the time, "Everyone's Gone to the Moon". King named the band Genesis (after previously suggesting the name Gabriel's Angels after lead singer Peter Gabriel), recalling that he had "thought it was a good name... it suggested the beginning of a new sound and a new feeling."
 Georgia Wonder — Georgia Wonder was the stage name of Lulu Hurst, a 'magnetic phenomenon' whose vaudeville act toured America in the late 19th century. Stephanie Grant and Julian Moore from the band chose the name after trying to duplicate these powers from an exposé they discovered in a book about the period.
 Glades — Comes from a ski run that member Cameron Robertson saw during a holiday. 
 Gorgoroth — Means "horror" in Sindarin, one of Tolkien's constructed languages.
 Grateful Dead — The name was chosen from a dictionary. According to Phil Lesh, in his biography (pp. 62), "...Jerry Garcia picked up an old Britannica World Language Dictionary... In that silvery elf-voice he said to me, 'Hey, man, how about the Grateful Dead? The definition there was "the soul of a dead person, or his angel, showing gratitude to someone who, as an act of charity, arranged their burial." According to Alan Trist, director of the Grateful Dead's music publisher company Ice Nine, Garcia found the name in the Funk & Wagnalls Folklore Dictionary, when his finger landed on that phrase while playing a game of "dictionary". In the Garcia biography, Captain Trips, author Sandy Troy states that the band was smoking the psychedelic DMT at the time. The term "grateful dead" appears in folktales of a variety of cultures.
 Green Day — A slang term for a day spent smoking marijuana. Frontman Billie Joe Armstrong wrote a song called "Green Day" about his first experience with the drug, and it soon replaced "Sweet Children" as the band's name.
 Guns N' Roses — An early incarnation of the band included Tracii Guns whose band was called L.A. Guns. Axl Rose, who had formed Hollywood Rose, combined his band with Tracii's to form Guns N' Roses.

H
 Hanoi Rocks — From "Hanoi rock", a type of pink heroin produced in Hanoi. The name was invented by Andy McCoy as an allusion to the Johnny Thunders/The Ramones song Chinese Rocks as "Chinese rock" is a type of white heroin that can be further refined into "Hanoi rock".
 Hard-Fi — "Hard-Fi" is the name given to the sound produced by Lee "Scratch" Perry, a Grammy award-winning reggae and dub artist, at his Black Ark recording studio. Being admirers of Perry's work, the band decided to name themselves after his distinctive sound.
 Hassisen Kone — Named after "Hassisen kone", a real-life home appliance store in the band's home town Joensuu. The owner of the store was offended by the band's choice of name and renamed the store as "Joensuun konepalvelu".
 Hawkwind — Named for member Nik Turner's "prodigious habit of spitting and flatulence."
 Hawthorne Heights — From the famous author Nathaniel Hawthorne. 
 Heaven 17 — From a line in Anthony Burgess' novel A Clockwork Orange, a fictional band mentioned by a young woman in the record store.
 Hevisaurus — From "hevi", the Finnish spelling of the word "heavy" (as in heavy metal), and "saurus" (as in dinosaur).
 HIM — An acronym for His Infernal Majesty.
 The Hollies — After Buddy Holly.
 Hoobastank — Derived from a street where Doug Robb's brother (the vice president of BMW Motorcycles, who lives in Germany) lives, called Hooba Street "or something like that".
 Hootie and the Blowfish — Lead singer Darius Rucker derived the name from two friends from college. One had an owlish face and was nicknamed "Hootie", while the other had puffy cheeks and was called "the Blowfish".
 The Hunna — From the members using the word "hunna" in conversations with each other, and "to influence other people to pick up an instrument, or anything, any passion that they may have, give 100%."
 Hurriganes — An intentional misspelling of the word "hurricanes". Remu Aaltonen, the band's vocalist, spoke no English at the time the band was formed.
 Hüsker Dü — Named after Hūsker Dū?, a Scandinavian memory-based board game that means (properly spelled as Husker Du? without the macrons) "Do you remember?" in Danish and Norwegian. The band chose this after it was shouted out by an audience member at one of their early shows.

I
 I Dont Know How But They Found Me — Vocalist Dallon Weekes has said that the name is a Back to the Future quote.
 Iggy Pop — From the band The Iguanas which he played in and a character called "Pop" whom he resembled.
 Imagine Dragons — Their name is an anagram for a phrase only known to members of the group, that lead singer Dan Reynolds stated each member approved of.
 Iron & Wine — Stage name of Samuel "Sam" Ervin Beam; the name Iron & Wine is taken from a dietary supplement named "Beef, Iron & Wine" that he found in a general store while shooting a film.
 Iron Maiden — Steve Harris named the band after the iron maiden torture device as shown in the 1939 film The Man in the Iron Mask.
 Irwin Goodman — Stage name of Antti Hammarberg; According to his friend Vexi Salmi, the name came from an amalgam of the names of Irving Berlin and Benny Goodman.

J
 Jamiroquai — An interlock of the words, "jam" and "iroquai"; the latter is based on the Iroquois, a Native American confederacy.
 Jefferson Airplane — Shortened from Blind Lemon Jefferson Airplane, which, according to Jorma Kaukonen, was coined by a friend as a satire of blues pseudonyms such as "Blind Lemon" Jefferson.
 Jethro Tull — Having trouble getting repeat bookings, the band took to changing their name frequently to continue playing the London club circuit. Band names were often supplied by their booking agents' staff, one of whom, a history enthusiast, eventually christened them "Jethro Tull" after the 18th-century agriculturist. The name stuck because they were using it the first time a club manager liked their show enough to invite them to return.
 Jimmy Eat World — "Jimmy" is guitarist Tom Linton's younger brother, who had a weight problem. Lead vocalist Jim Adkins' younger brother drew a picture on Jimmy's door of him putting a globe in his mouth, and wrote on it "Jimmy Eat World". It eventually inspired the band's name.
 Joy Division — In order to avoid confusion with the London punk band Warsaw Pakt, the band renamed themselves from Warsaw to Joy Division in late 1977, borrowing their new name from the prostitution wing of a Nazi concentration camp mentioned in the 1955 novel The House of Dolls.
 JVG — From the initials of the members of the band, Jare Joakim Brand and Ville-Petteri Galle.

K
 Kaiser Chiefs — After the South African Kaizer Chiefs Football Club, the former team of long-serving former Leeds United captain Lucas Radebe.
 Kari Tapio —  From Kari, the artist's real first name, and Tapio, a modified form of his real second name Tapani.
 Kasabian — After Linda Kasabian, a member of the Manson Family famous for serving as Charles Manson's getaway driver.
 Kassidy — Inspired by Butch Cassidy and the Sundance Kid.
 Keane — After Cherry Keane, an old woman who used to look after the band members when they were children.
 The Killers — From the bass drum of a fictional band in the music video for the New Order song "Crystal".
Killswitch Engage — From an episode of The X-Files.
 King Crimson — The band name was coined by lyricist Peter Sinfield as a synonym for Beelzebub, prince of demons. According to Robert Fripp, Beelzebub would be an anglicised form of the Arabic phrase "B'il Sabab", meaning "the man with an aim". Historically and etymologically, a "crimson king" was any monarch during whose reign there was civil unrest and copious bloodshed.
 King Krule — Originally known as Zoo Kid, he chose the name King Krule from the Elvis Presley film King Creole.
 KISS — Coined by word association with Peter Criss's previous band LIPS.
 Klaxons — Originally "Klaxons (Not Centaurs)", a quote from Filippo Tommaso Marinetti's futurism text The Futurist Manifesto. Also in an interview a band member stated Klaxons "is to toot to be a loud intrusive noise to disrupt".
 KJ-52 — Hybrid name of this artist's first rap name "KJ" coupled with the New Testament Miracle of the Feeding of the Multitude, Mark 8:1-9 and Matthew 15:32-39.
 KMFDM — An initialism for the nonsensical and grammatically incorrect German phrase "Kein Mehrheit Für Die Mitleid", which was intended to translate to "No pity for the majority". Chosen as a motto from words cut of a German newspaper for an exposition for young European artists and afterwards it was initialized as the name of the band.
 Knife Party — From the song "Knife Prty" by Deftones. The name caused consternation at first as it implied that they supported knife crime, although Rob Swire stated that "...we're not advocating any type of knife-related crime any more than Swedish House Mafia were advocating organised crime."
 Knuckle Puck — The band's name was inspired by a Stick to Your Guns t-shirt that said "Knuckle Puck Crew."
 Krewella — The band's name stems from member Jahan Yousaf's misspelling of the word "cruel" when she and her sister Yasmine began writing music, and is not a reference to Cruella de Vil.

L
 The La's — The band was formed in Liverpool, and "la" is a well-known Scouse phrase meaning "lad" or "mate".
 Ladytron — From the song "Ladytron" by Roxy Music.
 La Roux — The band's name refers to singer Elly Jackson's red hair and tomboyish appearance, mingling the masculine ("le roux") and feminine ("la rousse") French terms; she has said: "To me, it means 'red-haired one'—and it does, vaguely. It's just a male version of 'red-haired one.
 Lasgo — From the Scottish city Glasgow with the first and last letters removed.
 Led Zeppelin — The band name "Led Zeppelin" refers to the Hindenburg disaster; and a joke made by Keith Moon and John Entwistle. The two were discussing the idea of forming a band with some prominent young guitarists at the time. Moon and Entwistle suggested that a supergroup containing themselves, Jimmy Page, and Jeff Beck would go down like a "lead balloon", a British idiom for disastrous results. They intentionally misspelled the name to ensure correct pronunciation by announcers.
 Letters to Cleo — The name refers to lead singer Kay Hanley's childhood pen pal Cleo.
 Level 42 — From the Hitchhikers Guide To The Galaxy series of books by Douglas Adams. Some confusion surrounded the name in early years outwith their home country of the UK when, bored of journalists asking the same question "What does the band name mean" over and over they started to give different daft answers to amuse themselves, amongst them being that they were named after the worlds highest multi story car park etc.
 Lights — Born Valerie Poxleitner, "Lights" stemmed as a shortened nickname for her last name. She legally changed her name to Lights at age 18.
 Lindemann — after lead vocalist Till Lindemann. "Lindemann" is a German occupational surname meaning "woodman".
 Linkin Park — Their name came from the lead singer, Chester Bennington, because they had to change their name due to copyright issues, and he drove past Lincoln Park on the way home from band practice. However, the domain "lincolnpark.com" was more than they could afford, so they changed the spelling to 'Linkin Park'.
 Living Colour — From the NBC TV slogan "Broadcasting in Living Color."
 Lord of the Flies — Band member Alex d'Aquino looked at different band names and saw "Of Mice of Men", so he thought of a great British classic, "Lord of the Flies", about a group of British boys stuck on an uninhabitable island who try to govern themselves with disastrous results.
 Lothar and the Hand People — Band member Richard Willis had a dream in which an enslaved race called the Hand People was saved by a hero named Lothar. Later, well after the name had been chosen, they decided that Lothar was the name of the theremin used by member John Emelin.
Lynyrd Skynyrd — After Leonard Skinner, a gym teacher at Robert E. Lee High School in Jacksonville, Florida who was notorious for strictly enforcing the school's policy against boys having long hair.

M
 Måneskin — Danish for "moonlight", invented at random when Italian-Danish founding member Victoria De Angelis was asked by her fellow bandmembers to toss out some Danish words.
 Marillion — The band was originally called Silmarillion, taken from the title of a J.R.R. Tolkien novel. The name was eventually shortened to avoid possible legal problems.
 Marilyn Manson — For Marilyn Monroe and Charles Manson.
 Marshall Tucker Band — While the band was discussing possible band names one evening in an old warehouse they had rented for rehearsal space, someone noticed that the warehouse's door key had the name "Marshall Tucker" inscribed on it, and suggested they call themselves "The Marshall Tucker Band", not realizing it referred to an actual person. It later came to light that Marshall Tucker, a blind piano tuner, had rented the space before the band, and his name was inscribed on the key. In his book, Top Pop Singles, 1955–2002, music historian Joel Whitburn attributes "Marshall Tucker" to the owner of the band's rehearsal hall.
 Matchbox Twenty — Originally titled "Matchbox 20", the band took its name from a softball jersey with a "20" on it and a patch that had "Matchbox" written on it. The band altered its name to "Matchbox Twenty" after the release of its debut album Yourself or Someone Like You.
Mayday Parade — Members Alex and Jake decided on the name while recording their first EP.
 McFly — Guitarist/vocalist/songwriter Tom Fletcher took the name from the film Back to the Futures main character Marty McFly.
 Megadeth — While Dave Mustaine was traveling back to his home in the Bay Area on a bus after getting kicked out of his former band, Metallica, he would write lyrics on the back of a handbill to pass the time. The handbill itself quoted "The arsenal of megadeath can't be rid no matter what the peace treaties come to," which inspired him to use Megadeath as his band name. He dropped the A when he learned that "The Megadeaths" was a former name of Pink Floyd.
 Metric — Initially, their name was Mainstream. After releasing an EP titled Mainstream EP, they changed the band's name to Metric, after a sound that was programmed by the member James Shaw on his keyboard in 1998.
 MGMT — Disemvoweling of the band's original name, The Management.
 Minus the Bear — The name comes from an in-joke among the band members, referring to the 1970s television series B. J. and the Bear. "A friend of the band had gone on a date", explained the singer-guitarist Jake Snider, "and one of us asked him afterwards how the date went. Our friend said, 'You know that TV show from the '70s, B.J. and the Bear? It was like that... minus the Bear.' That's the straight truth."
 Misery Index — The Baltimore death metal band named themselves after the Misery Index, an economic indicator created by Arthur Okun, defined as the sum of the unemployment rate and the annual inflation rate.
 Misfits — The band was named after a motion picture released in 1961 entitled The Misfits. The Misfits' skull logo was derived from the villain of the 1946 motion picture The Crimson Ghost.
 MKTO — The members' initials: Malcolm Kelley and Tony Oller.
 Modest Mouse — Derives from a passage from the Virginia Woolf story "The Mark on the Wall", which reads, "...and very frequent even in the minds of modest, mouse-coloured people..."
 Mogwai — Named after the creatures from the film Gremlins.
 Molly Hatchet — A 17th-century southern prostitute who allegedly beheaded and/or chopped up her clients.
 Moloko — From the narcotic-filled milk drink, Moloko Plus, in the Anthony Burgess novel A Clockwork Orange, based on the Russian for milk, "молоко" ("moloko").
 The Moody Blues — The band were originally named The M&B 5 after the Birmingham brewery Mitchells & Butlers. This was changed and the new name was inspired by a Duke Ellington song named "Mood Indigo".
 Moottörin Jyrinä — "Moottorin jyrinä" means "the rumble of an engine" in Finnish. The band added a heavy metal umlaut to the word "moottorin" as a parody of Motörhead.
 Morgoth — The principal antagonist in Tolkien's Silmarillion.
 The Motels — Originally from Berkeley California the Warfield Foxes were en route to an early gig at Los Angeles club The Troubadour when guitarist Dean Chamberlain noticed the many motels along Santa Monica boulevard and quipped that they ought to change their name to The Motels because "our name will be in lights all across the country".
 The Mothers of Invention — Originally named The Mothers, renamed to The Mothers of Invention by Frank Zappa after their record label Verve Records suggested that the band rename themselves as "mother" is a slang term for "motherfucker".
 Mötley Crüe  — When Mick Mars was playing with his old cover band White Horse, he heard someone describing them as "motley-looking crew". He instantly took to the phrase and knew that someday he wanted to play in a band by that name. The spelling was eventually changed and umlauts were added.
 The Mountain Goats — Taken from the Screamin' Jay Hawkins song "Yellow Coat", which contains the line "50 million bulldogs, 20 mountain goats, all gathered 'round at sundown to see my yellow coat."
 Mumford & Sons — Originates from the fact that Marcus Mumford was always the most visible member, organizing the band and their performances from their beginnings in West London. Vocalist Ben Lovett indicated that the name was meant to invoke the sense of an "antiquated family business name".
 Muse — Front-man Matthew Bellamy stated that the band's name was mainly chosen because it looked professional on posters and the like. However, Bellamy has also stated that the name could possibly have stemmed from being raised in a family interested in Ouija and spirits. The bandmates first heard the word when someone in their hometown of Teignmouth, England, suggested that the reason for a lot of the town's populace becoming members of bands was a muse hovering over the town.
 My Bloody Valentine — Kevin Shields and Colm Ó Cíosóig formed My Bloody Valentine in early 1983 with lead vocalist David Conway. Conway, who performed under the pseudonym Dave Stelfox, suggested a number of potential band names, including the Burning Peacocks, before the trio settled on My Bloody Valentine. Shields has since claimed he was unaware that My Bloody Valentine was the title of a 1981 Canadian slasher film when the name was suggested.
 My Chemical Romance — Bassist Mikey Way, before joining the band, had a job at Barnes & Noble. The name came from Irvine Welsh's Ecstasy: Three Tales of Chemical Romance. Vocalist Gerard Way added the "My" to make the name more personal. It is also said to have been inspired from shoegaze band My Bloody Valentine.

N
 Ned's Atomic Dustbin — Title of an episode of The Goon Show that the mother of vocalist Jonn Penney would read to him.
 Night Ranger — Originally formed as Stereo by Jack Blades, Kelly Keagy and Brad Gillis, the band changed the name to simply Ranger after adding keyboardist Alan Fitzgerald and guitarist Jeff Watson. Due to a copyright infringement claim by a country band calling itself The Rangers, the band changed the name to Night Ranger.
 Nine Inch Nails — Sole constant member Trent Reznor chose the name because it "could be abbreviated easily" and denied the name had any "literal meaning".
 Nine Stories (Lisa Loeb And...) — Named after the J.D. Salinger book of short stories of that name; Loeb, an English major, wanted a literary moniker.
 Nirvana — Before settling on a permanent name, the band had played under many different names including 'Throat Oyster' and 'Ted, Ed, Fred'. In Buddhism, nirvana means release from the cycle of rebirth and suffering. Kurt Cobain chose the name and defined it to his bandmates as a word that describes the 'attainment of perfection'.
 No Doubt — Back-flipping original singer John Spence formed an Orange County-based 2 Tone ska group named after his favorite expression, with keyboardist Eric Stefani. After Spence's death, the name stuck.
 NOFX — guitarist Eric Melvin says that he came up with the name, inspired by the broken up punk band "Negative FX". The name is also meant to symbolize the band's rejection of gimmickry that the band was seeing in music at the time.
 The Notorious B.I.G. — From a childhood nickname "Big", because he was overweight at the age of 10.
 NSYNC — received its name after Justin Timberlake's mother commented on how "in sync" the group's singing voices were. The group's name is also a play on the last letter of each of the initial members' names: JustiN, ChriS, JoeY, JasoN, and JC.

O
 Oasis — Evolved from an earlier band called The Rain, composed of Paul "Guigsy" McGuigan (bass guitar), Paul "Bonehead" Arthurs (guitar), Tony McCarroll (drums) and Chris Hutton (vocals). Unsatisfied with Hutton, Arthurs auditioned acquaintance Liam Gallagher as a replacement. After Gallagher joined the group, the band's name was changed to Oasis, which was inspired by a place where Inspiral Carpets played, the Oasis Leisure Centre in Swindon.
 Odesza — the band's name was taken from the name of Harrison Mills' uncle's sunken vessel, which itself was named after the Ukrainian city of Odesa. Only his uncle and one other crew mate survived. Since the spelling "Odessa" was already being used by a Scottish synth band, they instead chose to use a form of the Hungarian spelling, replacing the "ss" with "sz". The correct spelling in Hungarian is: Odessza.
 The Offspring — Band members Dexter Holland and Greg K decided to form a band after attending a Social Distortion concert. The band was called Manic Subsidal, who suddenly changed their name to The Offspring in 1986.
 Of Mice & Men — After the novel by John Steinbeck. Steinbeck himself took the name from a line in the poem "To A Mouse" by Robert Burns, which reads "The best-laid schemes o' mice an 'men Gang aft agley"
 OK Go — Came from an art teacher of Damian Kulash and Tim Nordwind saying "OK... Go!" while they were drawing during the Interlochen Arts Camp.
 Okilly Dokilly — From the signature phrase of The Simpsons character Ned Flanders. The band plays "Nedal" music and even dress up as Ned Flanders.
 One Night Only — Came about when the band were asked to play a gig; they did not have a name at the time and so came up with One Night Only, intending for the title to, literally, last for only one night. However, the name stuck and they continued to use it.
 One Ok Rock — Comes from "one o'clock", the time that the band used to practice on weekends, but due to the Japanese language making no distinction between R's and L's, they changed "O'CLOCK" to "O'CROCK" (or "O'KROCK"), which was then separated to become "OK ROCK".
 OneRepublic — Originally called "Republic", the name was changed after Columbia Records mentioned that the name might result in legal action from other, similarly-named bands.
Opeth — Derived from the word "Opet", taken from the Wilbur Smith novel Sunbird. In this novel, Opet is the name of a (fictional) Phoenician city in South Africa whose name is translated as "City of the Moon" in the book.

P
 Panic! at the Disco — Lifted from the lyrics of a song called "Panic", by Name Taken: "Panic at the disco/Sat back and took it so slow."
 Pantera — Named after guitarist Dimebag Darrell's car, a De Tomaso Pantera.
 Paramore — According to lead singer Hayley Williams, the name "Paramore" came from the maiden name of the mother of one of their first bass players. Once the group learned the meaning of the homophone paramour ("secret lover"), they decided to adopt the name, using the Paramore spelling.
 Paris Match — From the title of a song by The Style Council.
 Passion Pit — The band culled their name from the Variety Slanguage Dictionary, a glossary of Variety's frequently used slang, which was provided by the Hollywood insider publication to help not-so-savvy readers decipher its content. The magazine used the term to refer to drive-in theatres, because of their privacy and romantic allure for teenagers.
 Pearl Jam — The band's first name was "Mookie Blaylock" after the All-Star basketball player, but the name was changed to "Pearl Jam" due to trademark concerns. Vocalist Eddie Vedder claimed in an early interview that the name was a reference to his great-grandmother Pearl Brunner. In 2006 guitarist Mike McCready said that bass player Jeff Ament came up with "Pearl" and that "Jam" was added after seeing Neil Young live.
 Pet Shop Boys — From friends who worked in a pet shop in Ealing, and were known as the "pet shop boys".
 Phantogram — Formerly known as Charlie Everywhere, they wanted to change their name to "something [they] liked". They came up with the word 'phantogram' and thought it was interesting. Upon looking it up and finding it referred to an optical illusion, they found parallels with their band and music.
 Phish — A portmanteau of drummer Jon Fishman's nickname "Fish" and "phshhhh", an onomatopoeia of the sound of a brush on a snare drum.
 Phoenix — After the song "Phoenix" from Daft Punk's debut album Homework. It has also been speculated that the band named themselves after actor Joaquin Phoenix, who, like the two main guitar players/brothers, has a scar left over from cleft palate surgery in childhood.
 Piirpauke — Comes from the Karelian father of founding member Sakari Kukko, means a noise or a racket.
 Pilot — The name came from the last initials of the founding members of the band, David Paton (lead vocals/bass), Billy Lyall (keyboards), and Stuart Tosh (drums). In an interview with David Paton, he said that the idea came from the producer's girlfriend. While Ian Bairnson was involved with the band's first album, he was not an official member of the band until their second album, Second Flight.
 Pink Floyd — Playing under multiple names, including "Tea Set", when the band found themselves on the same bill as another band with the same name, Syd Barrett came up with the alternative name The Pink Floyd Sound, after two blues musicians, Pink Anderson and Floyd Council.  For a time after this they oscillated between The Tea Set and The Pink Floyd Sound, with the latter name eventually winning out. The Sound was dropped fairly quickly, but the definite article was still used regularly until 1970. The group's UK releases during the Syd Barrett era credited them as The Pink Floyd as did their first two U.S. singles. The albums More and Ummagumma (both 1969) credit the band as Pink Floyd, produced by The Pink Floyd, while Atom Heart Mother (1970) credits the band as The Pink Floyd, produced by Pink Floyd. David Gilmour is known to have referred to the group as The Pink Floyd as late as 1984.
 Pixies — Selected randomly from a dictionary by guitarist Joey Santiago. The band took a liking to the word's definition, "mischievous little elves". The name was shortened from the original "Pixies In Panoply".
 +44 — Pronounced "plus forty four", a reference to the international dialing code of the United Kingdom, where band members Mark Hoppus and Travis Barker first discussed the project.
 PMMP — From the names of the band members, Paula Vesala and Mira Luoti. The abbreviation originally meant "Paulan ja Miran molemmat puolet" ("both sides of Paula and Mira") but the band has also explained it simply means "Paula, Mira, Mira, Paula" in a similar fashion as the Swedish band ABBA chose their name.
 The Pogues — Originally called Póg mo Thóin—Irish for "Kiss my arse". Shortened to The Pogues after complaints received by the BBC.
 Poliça — According to singer Channy Leaneagh, Poliça is Polish for "policy", and she sees it as a reference to an unwritten code that guides the members when they play together, as well as its work ethic. (Contrary to this explanation, the Polish word for "policy" is actually polityka.) In another interview, Leaneagh claimed that they wanted something unique, and she had a file on her computer which, following a corruption during a computer crash, had come back as "Poliça".
 Popeda — an intentional misspelling of the name of the iconic Soviet car GAZ-M20 Pobeda.
 Porno for Pyros — Inspired by the 1992 Los Angeles riots.
  Portishead — After the English town of Portishead, Somerset, the hometown of one of the band's founding members, Geoff Barrow.
 The Postal Service — Chosen because of the band's production method: producer Jimmy Tamborello would mail raw versions to vocalist Ben Gibbard, who would edit them and mail them back through the United States Postal Service.
 Press Play On Tape — From the message displayed by the Commodore 64 home computer when starting to load a program from the cassette tape drive. The band's music consists of remixes of tunes from famous Commodore 64 games.
 Procol Harum — From the pedigree name of a Siamese cat that belonged to a friend of Guy Stevens, the band's manager. The name was Procul Harum, which is Latin for "beyond these things", but was written down incorrectly by Keith Reid. The band would say in interviews that the cat was a Burmese Blue, though all cats with the name are the Devon Rex breed.
 The Prodigy — Bandleader Liam Howlett's first synthesiser was a Moog Prodigy.
 Pvris – Paris spelled with "V" instead of "A"

Q
 Queen — Were originally called Smile. Singer Freddie Mercury came up with the new name for the band, later saying: "Years ago I thought up the name 'Queen' ... It's just a name, but it's very regal obviously, and it sounds splendid ... It's a strong name, very universal and immediate. It had a lot of visual potential and was open to all sorts of interpretations. I was certainly aware of gay connotations, but that was just one face of it."
 Queens of the Stone Age — A name given by Criss Goss, who said the name implied they were "heavy enough for the boys and sweet enough for the girls", while 'Kings of the Stone Age' was described to be "too macho" and lopsided.
 Queensrÿche — Were originally called "The Mob". The name is derived from a song on their EP "Queen of the Reich", and is the only known use of the letter Y with an umlaut in English. It was used to soften "Queensreich" and not confuse the band with Nazism.
Qntal — In a dream, vocalist Sigrid Hausen saw the letters in flames.

R
 Radiohead — Originally known as "On a Friday", the band was given two weeks after signing to Parlophone to change their name. The band renamed themselves after the 1986 Talking Heads song "Radio Head" on the album True Stories, claiming it was the "least annoying song" on the album.
 Rage Against the Machine — When the band formed in 1991, they chose the name of a song Zack de la Rocha had written for his old band, Inside Out.
 Rammstein — The band was named after the 1988 Ramstein air show disaster. At first, the band had denied this and said that their name was inspired by the giant doorstop type devices found on old gates, called Rammsteine. The extra "m" in the band's name makes it translate literally as "ramming stone".
 The Ramones — Paul McCartney used the alias Paul Ramon when booking hotel rooms. So the band decided to use the last name Ramone even though it's not their surname.
 R.E.M. — Vocalist Michael Stipe drew the initialism randomly out of the dictionary. The term refers to the rapid eye movement phase of sleep. Stipe says that is not the reason why the band is named R.E.M.
Reel Big Fish — The band chose this name in favor of "The Fisher King", a reference to the film of the same name, as well as "Dull Boy Jack", a reference to The Shining. The final name was chosen almost arbitrarily, under the notion that it could be changed later. Bassist Matt Wong suggested "Real Big Fish", and Aaron Barrett suggested changing the "A" to a second "E". However, the name stuck, much to the chagrin of the band.
 Relient K — Named after the car that guitarist Matt Hoopes drove in high school, a Plymouth Reliant K car. The spelling was intentionally altered to avoid a lawsuit.
 The Replacements — Originally named the Impediments, the band changed its name to the Replacements following a June 1980 church hall gig in Minneapolis in which they were banned due to disorderly behavior.
 The Residents — In 1971 the group sent a reel-to-reel tape to Hal Halverstadt at Warner Brothers. Because the band had not included any name in the return address, the rejection slip was simply addressed to "The Residents". The members of the group then decided that this would be the name they would use, first becoming Residents Unincorporated, then shortening it to the current name.
 REO Speedwagon — After Ransom E. Olds's REO Speed Wagon, which band founder Neal Doughty studied in his transportation history class at the University of Illinois.
 The Rolling Stones — From the Muddy Waters song, "Rollin' Stone".
 Röyksopp — From "røyksopp", the Norwegian word for the puffball mushroom, substituting a Swedish "ö" for the Norwegian "ø".
 Rush — The band was in need to quickly find a name for themselves just before a gig, when John Rutsey's brother suggested: "Why don't you call your band Rush?".
Russian Circles — Originally the title of their first piece, which was later called "Carpe". Russian Circles is a drill in hockey.

S
 Saving Abel — From the ancient biblical story of Cain and Abel, about a brother who killed his own brother. Band member Jason Null thought up the band title saying "I Googled the story of Cain and Abel and found a line about 'there was no saving Abel', which just jumped out at me."
 School of Seven Bells — A mythical South American pickpocket training academy.
 Seagull Screaming Kiss Her Kiss Her — After a song by XTC on their album The Big Express.
 Seether — Originally Saron Gas. The band was asked to change their name due to Saron Gas being a homophone of sarin gas, a deadly nerve agent. The band changed its name to Seether in honor of Veruca Salt's song titled, "Seether".
 Sepultura — Means "Grave" in Portuguese. The name was chosen after co-founder Max Cavalera translated the lyrics to the Motörhead song "Dancing on Your Grave".
 Sevendust — After discovering their name Crawlspace was already taken, band bassist Vinnie Hornsby renamed the band after a brand of plant pesticide he found in his grandmother's garage named Sevin dust.
 Shai Hulud — After the gigantic Sandworms of Arrakis from the 1984 science fiction film Dune, based on the Frank Herbert science fiction novel of the same name.
 Sigue Sigue Sputnik — The group's name is a very rough translation of the Russian phrase "burn, burn Sputnik" or "burn, burn, satellite" and is claimed by the band to be an adaptation of the name of a Russian street gang. The name is also a nod to the band's anti-conventional rock image; in a 1986 interview, band founder Tony James remembered reading that, after seeing Sputnik pass over the earth, Little Richard gave up rock and roll. James "took that as a good omen" for the band's name choice.
 Sigur Rós — After the little sister of the band's vocalist, Jón Þór Birgisson (Jónsi), whose name is Sigurrós (without a space). It translates to "victory rose".
 Silver Apples — Taken from the W.B. Yeats poem "The Song of Wandering Aengus", which references "The silver apples of the moon, the golden apples of the sun." 
 Silversun Pickups — Derived from a liquor store located across from Silverlake Lounge in Los Angeles, where they often played in their early days. A band member would often arrive at the store late at night to buy liquor, making a "Silversun Pickup". In interviews, the band has said its name is more of "a state of mind".
 Simple Minds — From a line in the David Bowie song "The Jean Genie".
 Simply Red — The name came about when the manager of a local venue was confused about the band's name and Mick Hucknall replied that it was "Red, simply Red". The resulting misnomer was printed on publicity posters as "Simply Red", and the name stuck.
 Skillet — Each starting band member was already in a separate band, and all decided to start a side project together. Since each other band had a different sound and style to it, the side project was said to be like putting all of those styles in a big skillet to come up with something unique.
 Sleigh Bells — Guitarist Derek Miller wrote "Sleigh Bells" on CD-Rs he distributed his demos on, before forming the band.
 Slint — The band took their name from drummer Britt Walford's pet fish.
 Slipknot — Drummer Joey Jordison suggested renaming the band from "Meld" to "Slipknot" after their song that eventually appeared on the band's demo Mate. Feed. Kill. Repeat.
 Sloan — According to band member Jay Ferguson, the band's name refers to a friend's nickname. Their friend Jason Larsen was called "slow one" by his French-speaking boss, which with the French accent sounded more like "Sloan". The original agreement was that they could name the band after their friend's nickname as long as he was on the cover of their first album. As a result, it is Larsen who appears on the cover of Sloan's Peppermint EP.
 Smashing Pumpkins — Frontman Billy Corgan had come up with this name as a joke years before the band had ever formed. Whenever people asked if he was in a band, he would tell them it was called Smashing Pumpkins for a laugh. The name stuck after the band formed, despite dissension from fellow band members.
 Snow — Darren O'Brien's nickname given to him because he was one of the only white people in an ethnically diverse neighbourhood in Canada.
 Soilwork — Chosen by the band to symbolize "working from the ground up".
 Social Distortion — Named after drummer Casey Royer's distortion pedal which he gave to lead vocalist, Mike Ness because he was not good at playing back then.
 Soundgarden — The band took their name from a huge pipe sculpture in Seattle's Sand Point titled "A Sound Garden".
 The Soup Dragons — The early 70s animation "Clangers" had a character named the Soup Dragon, who would harvest Green Soup from a volcano.
 Space — Guitarist Jamie Murphy named the band after the original working title of The Real People's song "My Own Dream". The band had been previously known as The Substitutes, after The Who's song "Substitute". 
 Spandau Ballet — The name was coined after a close friend of the band, the DJ Robert Elms, saw the words Spandau Ballet written on the wall of a lavatory in a Berlin nightclub; it is a reference to Spandau Prison and the "ballet" refers to the jerky movements that prisoners made when they were hanged.
 Squeeze — The group performed under several names, most frequently "Captain Trundlow's Sky Company" or "Skyco", before settling on the band name "Squeeze" as a facetious tribute to the Velvet Underground's oft-derided 1973 album Squeeze.
 Squirrel Nut Zippers — A peanut and caramel candy from the 1920s.
 Stabbing Westward — Christopher Hall and Walter Flakus formed the band Stabbing Westward when they were in college. They came up with the name while working at the college radio station WIUS-FM. During an interview in 1996, Hall stated, "Since we went to Western Illinois University, Stabbing Westward had a certain 'kill everybody in the school' vibe to it! The school's way out in farm country and the country is really close minded. I was walking around like Robert Smith with real big hair, big baggy black clothes, black fingernail polish and eye makeup. They just didn't get it. We hated the town."
 Staind — The band was originally called "Stain". They added the D when they found another group, which then became Kilgore Smudge and Lit, already had the name.
 Status Quo (band) — Suggested by their then manager, Pat Barlow, having just bought a pair of shoes manufactured by a company called "Quo Vardis".
 Steeleye Span — John "Steeleye" Span is a character in the song "Horkstow Grange".
 Steely Dan — A dildo in the novel Naked Lunch by William S. Burroughs.
 Steen1 — The artist originally chose Steen Christensen as his artist name after the Danish criminal who shot and killed two police officers in Finland (the artist is unrelated to the criminal), but later changed it to Steen1 because of too much controversy.
 Stereolab — Named after the electronic music division of Vanguard Records, a publisher of classical, folk, and jazz records.
 Stone Sour — A cocktail made up of one part whiskey and a splash of orange juice. The group describe their music as one part pure rock adrenaline with a splash of melody.
 Stryper — Originally derived from the King James Version of Isaiah 53:5, drummer Robert Sweet created the acronym: Salvation Through Redemption, Yielding Peace, Encouragement, and Righteousness.
 Styx — In 1972 the band members decided to choose a new name when they signed to Wooden Nickel Records after being spotted by a talent scout at a concert at St. John of the Cross Parish in Western Springs, Illinois (James "JY" Young's hometown). Several suggestions were made and, according to DeYoung, the name Styx was chosen because it was "the only one that none of us hated".
 Sum 41 — The band started 41 days into the summer. The band was originally a NOFX cover band named Kaspir; they changed their name to Sum 41 for a Supernova show on September 28, 1996.
 Sunn O))) — After the Sunn amplifier brand. The O and the three right parentheses come from the sphere and waves depicted in the Sunn logo.
 Super Furry Animals — Derived from a clothing range set up by singer Gruff Rhys's sister.
 Switchfoot — A surfing term meaning being able to ride with either foot forward.
 System of a Down — Derived from a poem written by the guitarist Daron Malakian, named 'Victims of a Down', which was changed to System of a Down to place them closer alphabetically to their idols Slayer.

T
 Taking Back Sunday — A song by Long Island band The Waiting Process who were inspired by their grandmother, Tina, that they should take back Sunday from the Christian people in Long Island.
 Talking Heads — Bassist Tina Weymouth explained that "A friend had found the name in the TV Guide, which explained the term used by TV studios to describe a head-and-shoulder shot of a person talking as 'all content, no action.' It fit."
 Tangerine Dream — Edgar Froese, in an interview in Let It Rock magazine, claimed they named themselves 'after the Beatles line in the song Lucy in the Sky with Diamonds'. Clearly, with English not being his first language, he misheard 'Tangerine Trees' as 'Tangerine Dreams'.
 Tears for Fears — from a line in the book Prisoners of Pain by American psychologist Arthur Janov. Much of the band's early material is influenced by Janov's writings.
 Teddybears — Invented as a way to stand out at a time when almost every Swedish and Norwegian hard rock band was named something like "Corpse Grinder from Hell". 
 Thee Michelle Gun Elephant — A friend of the band mispronounced the name of The Damned's album Machine Gun Etiquette.
 Therapy? — The band chose the name because it was a simple word that everyone knows. The reason for the question mark at the end of the name was because when lead singer and guitarist Andy Cairns was writing out the spines for the cassettes to send off to the record companies, he began writing too far to the left, so to centre the writing and make it look more professional, he added a question mark to the end and it stuck with the band.
 They Might Be Giants — The name of a 1971 film, in which George C. Scott plays a man who believes he is Sherlock Holmes. The film's title is in turn a reference to the literary character Don Quixote, who mistook windmills for giants. The name had previously been used by a ventriloquist friend of the band.
 Thirty Seconds to Mars — The name of the band came after a thesis of an ex-professor of Harvard. One of the sub-sections was titled as "Thirty Seconds To Mars"  and talks about the technological advance that connects with humans and it said that we were literally 30 seconds from Mars. The band on their origins said that that phrase describes their music in a nutshell.
 Three Days Grace — According to frontman Adam Gontier, the name refers to a sense of urgency, with the question of being whether someone could change something in their life which would take at least three days.
 Three Dog Night — According to The Three Dog Night Story, 1964–1975, vocalist Danny Hutton's then-girlfriend June Fairchild suggested the name after reading a magazine article about indigenous Australians, in which it was explained that on cold nights they would customarily sleep in a hole in the ground whilst embracing a dingo, a native species of wild dog. On colder nights they would sleep with two dogs and if the night were freezing, it was a "three dog night".
 Thompson Twins — From Thomson and Thompson, the bumbling detectives in Hergé's comic strip series The Adventures of Tintin.
TLC — Acronym for their nicknames T-Boz, Left Eye, and Chilli.
 Toad the Wet Sprocket — In Eric Idle's monologue "Rock Notes" (heard on Monty Python's Contractual Obligation Album), a journalist reports that "Rex Stardust, lead electric triangle with Toad the Wet Sprocket, has had to have a elbow removed following their recent successful worldwide tour of Finland."
 Tokio Hotel — After "Tokio", the German spelling of the Japanese city Tokyo, due to the band's love of the city, and "Hotel" due to their constant touring and living in hotels.
 Toto — In the early 1980s, band members told the press that the band was named after the dog in The Wizard of Oz.
 Two Door Cinema Club — Came about after band member Sam Halliday mispronounced the name of the local cinema, Tudor Cinema, and this stuck.
 Trap Them — The band named themselves after the 1977 sexploitation horror film Trap Them And Kill Them, better known as Emanuelle and the Last Cannibals.
 Tuomari Nurmio — Literally means "Judge Nurmio" in Finnish. The artist has a master's degree in law and thus is eligible to actually formally practice as a judge, but he chose a career in music instead.
 Turo's Hevi Gee — Originally named "Turo's Hevi Gentlemen" after Pedro Hietanen's band Pedro's Heavy Gentlemen, later changed to "Turo's Hevi Gee" on Hietanen's suggestion, to avoid confusion.
 Twenty One Pilots — Lead singer Tyler Joseph got the name from studying the play All My Sons by Arthur Miller in a theatre class. The play is set in World War II, and the main character finds that parts to various planes are faulty but lets them fly anyway, resulting in the deaths of 21 pilots.

U
 U2 — Bono once said that the band name came from its interactivity with the audience, as in "you too". U2 is also the designation of a famous spy plane (as U-2), as well as the name of the subway line that connected East and West Berlin, on which Zoo Station (also the name of a song on the album Achtung Baby) is found.
 UB40 — The UK government's form number for the Unemployment Benefit Attendance Card, as shown on the band's debut album Signing Off.
 UBBA — An acronym of the Swedish phrase "Utan B, Bara A", meaning "without B, only A". The name is an intentional spoof of the famous Swedish band ABBA, but the resemblance to the Viking chief Ubba is just a coincidence.
 Ugly Kid Joe — A parody of the LA glam band, Pretty Boy Floyd.
 Undercover Slut — After Wendy Whitebread, Undercover Slut, an X-rated comic book from 1990.
 Uriah Heep — Creepy character from the novel David Copperfield by Charles Dickens.

V
 Vampire Weekend — Chris Baio explained that the band's singer, Ezra Koenig, had filmed a low-budget vampire movie with this title two-and-a-half years before the band formed.
Van Halen — The last name of the band's lead guitarist Eddie Van Halen and drummer Alex Van Halen. Although initially called Mammoth, the band changed its name when it found out Mammoth was already taken by another band.
 The Velvet Underground — After a book about sadomasochism by Michael Leigh.
 Veruca Salt — After the character from the children's novel, Charlie and the Chocolate Factory. 
 The Villebillies — From a lyric written by vocalist Derek "Child" Monyhan shortly after joining the group. It is a combination of the words Louisville, the band's hometown and largest urban center in Kentucky (often locally nicknamed "The Ville"), and hillbilly, referring to eastern Kentucky's rural mountain culture. The name references the cross genre nature of the band's music.
 Violent Femmes — According to bassist Brian Ritchie, he came up with the name of the group as a fake band name when one of his bandmates questioned his assertion that his brother was also in a band—he and percussionist Victor DeLorenzo liked the name, so they used it for themselves.
VAST — The acronym VAST stands for Visual Audio Sensory Theater and is the main creation of singer/songwriter and multi-instrumentalist Jon Crosby

W
Wang Chung — The Chinese word 黃鐘 huang chung means "yellow bell" and the first note in the Chinese classical music scale.
Wardruna — Einar Selvik has stated that the name 'Wardruna' means 'warden of the runes'.
 Weezer — Lead vocalist Rivers Cuomo needed to come up with a name when the band received a big break to open for Keanu Reeves' band Dogstar in 1992. Cuomo quickly nominated Weezer, a nickname given to him when he was a kid by other children who were teasing him about his asthma. Afterwards, the band had a long meeting and kicked around many more names, but nobody could come up with anything better.
 The Whitlams — After the 21st Prime Minister of Australia, Gough Whitlam. 
 The Who — Were originally called The Detours, then changed their name to The Who after a suggestion by guitarist Pete Townshend's friend Richard Barnes. Their first manager, Pete Meaden, renamed them The High Numbers, and they released one unsuccessful single, "Zoot Suit", under that name. When EMI dropped them, the band sacked Meaden and went back to being called The Who. Another possible reason was because of Townshend's grandmother, who would always refer to popular bands as "The Who?", due to her impaired hearing.
 Widespread Panic — Due to anxiety problems, lead guitarist Mike Houser used to have the nickname "Panic". One day he came home and announced that he did not want to be just "Panic", he wanted to be "Widespread Panic".
 Wilco — After the CB radio Radiotelephony procedure for "Will Comply", a choice which lead singer and guitarist Jeff Tweedy has called "fairly ironic for a rock band to name themselves."
 Wild Beasts — The band took their name the early 20th century art movement Fauvism (from French fauves meaning 'wild beasts'), pioneered in France by Henri Matisse and André Derain. The band had originally formed under the name 'Fauve' before translating it to English.
 Will to Power — A dance music band from Miami, Florida whose name is taken from Nietzsche's concept in philosophy
 The Wombats — The band members used to jokingly call each other wombats; when they needed a name for the promotional materials for their first gig, guitarist Dan Haggis suggested "The Wombats".
 Woodhands — Member Dan Werb chose the name because he "wanted to let everyone know that there was an organic element to the ambient electronic music I was making."
 Wu-Tang Clan — RZA and Ol' Dirty Bastard adopted the name for the rap group after seeing the Kung fu film Shaolin and Wu Tang, which features a school of warriors trained in Wu-Tang style.

X
 X Japan — The band added "Japan" in order to distinguish from the American punk group X.
 Xiu Xiu — From the 1998 Chinese film Xiu Xiu: The Sent Down Girl.
 XTC — A phonetic spelling of ecstasy, which Andy Partridge claims was inspired by the way actor Jimmy Durante emphasises the word in his song "I'm the Guy Who Found the Lost Chord" from the film This Time for Keeps.
 The xx — The band's name was inspired by typing two lower-case "X"s together in Microsoft Word.

Y
 The Yardbirds — Grew out of Keith Relf's The Metropolitan Blues Quartet. When the band changed members in 1963, Relf changed the name to The Yardbirds, partly from the nickname of jazz saxophonist Charlie Parker, "Bird", and partly from the American slang for prisoner.
 Yes  — Group members were searching for an appropriate name but needed a name to play their first gig under. They played their first gig on August 3 under the name Yes, suggested by Peter Banks as being short, positive, direct, and memorable. It was originally intended as a temporary solution until a permanent name could be found. Obviously, the name stuck.
 Yo La Tengo — The name is a reference to a story about the 1962 US Major League Baseball expansion team, the New York Mets. When two players chase the same batted fly ball, customarily one yells "I've got it" and the other then retreats to avoid a collision. But infielder Elio Chacón did not understand the English term, so he and outfielder Richie Ashburn collided a few times while chasing fly balls. Another teammate suggested that Ashburn yell the words in Spanish instead—"yo la tengo"—so Chacón would understand. After that Ashburn and Chacón no longer ran into each other. But another teammate, Frank Thomas, did not understand the Spanish term. So one day while chasing a fly ball, despite hearing Ashburn call out "yo la tengo", Howard ran into Ashburn.
 Young Fathers — The band was named so because all three members have their fathers' names.
 Youth Lagoon — Inspired by a painting that Trevor Powers described in an early interview as depicting a group of children playing in a giant pool.

Z
 Zox — From the last name of drummer John Zox.
 Zao — Original vocalist Eric Reeder came up with this name, meaning "alive" in Greek.
 ZZ Top — Billy Gibbons wrote in his autobiography "Billy F Gibbons: Rock + Roll Gearhead" that he used to live in an apartment decorated with several concert posters and flyers, including Z.Z. Hill and B.B. King. After playing around with names like Z.Z. King and B.B. Hill he ended up with ZZ Top.

See also 

 Lists of etymologies
 List of bands named after other performers' songs
 List of original names of bands

References

Bibliography
 Dolgins, Adam (1998). Rock Names: From Abba to ZZ Top: How Rock Bands Got Their Names. Cidermill Books. .
 Wilson, Dave (2005). Rock Formations: Categorical Answers to How Band Names Were Formed. Carol Pub. Group. .

Name Etymologies
Lists of etymologies